The Fort de l'Infernet is a fortification complex near Briançon in the French Alps. It was built as part of the Séré de Rivières system of fortifications in 1876–78 to defend France against invasion from Italy. It specifically overlooks the valley of the Durance behind and the Fort du Gondran, closer to Italy. It was the last French fort to be built from cut stone masonry.

The construction of the fort required that its mountaintop be leveled, a process that produced landslides.

The 210-man garrison served an armament consisting of seven 138mm guns, five 155mm guns, two 220mm mortars, two 150mm mortars and six more 138mm guns in a separate battery. Much of the armament was placed on a cavalier or gun platform on top of the masonry barracks. The garrison was accommodated in two barracks at somewhat lower elevation, La Cochette and La Seyte, with a portion of the total contingent rotated into the fort for duty. The aerial tramway was operated by mule power.

In 1940 the fort was manned as a backup fortification to the Alpine Line fortifications of the Maginot Line program, and was bombarded on 21 and 23 June 1940 by mortars at Fort Chaberton. 280mm field mortars placed at Infernet replied, silencing the Italian battery.

References

External links
 Fort de l'Infernet at Chemins de mèmoire
 Fort de l'Infernet at fortiffsere.fr 

Buildings and structures in Alpes-de-Haute-Provence
Fortifications of Briançon
Séré de Rivières system
Alpine Line
Fortified Sector of Dauphine